Alexander Barkley (May 4, 1817 Argyle, Washington County, New York - January 2, 1893 Argyle, Washington County, NY) was an American politician from New York.

Life
He was the son of James Barkley (1789–1843) and Margaret (MacDougall) Barkley (1795–1857).

In 1861, he was appointed Superintendent of Canal Repairs for Sections 1 and 2 of the Champlain Canal. He was a member of the New York State Assembly (Washington Co., 1st D.) in 1865 and 1866.

At the New York state election, 1868, he ran for Canal Commissioner on the Republican ticket but was defeated by Democrat Oliver Bascom. At the New York state election, 1870, he ran again but was again defeated, this time by the incumbent Democrat George W. Chapman. At the New York state election, 1871, he ran again and was elected, being in office from 1872 to 1874. At the New York state election, 1874, he was defeated for re-election by Democrat Adin Thayer. During the investigation of the Canal Ring, Barkley was indicted by a grand jury in Buffalo, New York for conspiracy.

He was buried at the Prospect Hill Cemetery in Argyle, NY.

Sources
 Barkley genealogy at RootsWeb
Annual Report of the Canal Commissioners (1862) [gives name as "Barckley"]
THE STATE TICKET in NYT on July 11, 1868
THE NOVEMBER ELECTION in NYT on October 30, 1870
THE CANAL FRAUDS in NYT on October 3, 1875
[https://www.findagrave.com/memorial/135376694/alexander-barkley

1817 births
1893 deaths
People from Argyle, New York
Erie Canal Commissioners
New York (state) Republicans